Giants Grave Football Club is an amateur Welsh football team based in Giant's Grave, Neath Port Talbot, Wales. They play in the West Wales Premier League which is in the fourth tier of the Welsh football league system.

History

Founded 1960's.

Honours
West Wales Premier League Cup – Runners-up: 2021–22
Neath & District League Premier Division – Champions (6): 1995–96; 2007–08; 2009–10; 2010–11; 2014–15; 2017–18

References

External links
official twitter

Football clubs in Wales
West Wales Premier League clubs
Neath & District League clubs